This is the list of tourist attractions in Johor, Malaysia.

Convention centers
 Persada Johor International Convention Centre
 Mid Valley Exhibition Centre

Historical buildings
 Johor Bahru Prison
 Sultan Ibrahim Building

Mausoleums
 Mahmoodiah Royal Mausoleum

Museums
 Bugis Museum
 Figure Museum
 Johor Bahru Chinese Heritage Museum
 Kite Museum
 KTM Museum
 Kota Johor Lama Museum
 Kota Tinggi Museum
 Pineapple Museum
 Tanjung Balau Fishermen Museum

Islands
 Aur Island
 Besar Island
 Kukup Island
 Pemanggil Island
 Rawa Island
 Sibu Island

Mountains and hills
 Mount Banang
 Mount Belumut
 Mount Lambak
 Mount Ma'okil
 Mount Ophir
 Mount Pulai

Nature
 Endau-Rompin National Park
 Desaru Beach
 Cape Piai
 Kota Tinggi Waterfalls
 Sungai Gersik Hot Spring

Public squares
 Johor Bahru City Square
 Dataran Penggaram, Batu Pahat
 Dataran Segamat, Segamat

Religious places

Buddhist temples
 Ching Giap See Temple (净业寺), in Muar
 Santi Forest Monastery, in Johor Bahru (Ulu Tiram)

Chinese temples
 Johor Bahru Old Chinese Temple, in Johor Bahru
 Sam Siang Keng (三善宫), in Johor Bahru
 Nan Ting Si Temple (南亭寺), in Muar

Church
 Cathedral of the Sacred Heart of Jesus, Johor Bahru
 Church of the Immaculate Conception, Johor Bahru
 Church of the Immaculate Heart of Mary, Pontian
 Skudai Catholic Center

Hindu temples
 Arulmigu Sri Rajakaliamman Glass Temple

Mosques
 An-Nur Kota Raya Mosque
 Bandar Baru UDA Jamek Mosque
 Nong Chik Jamek Mosque
 Pasir Gudang Jamek Mosque
 Pasir Pelangi Royal Mosque
 Senai Airport Mosque
 Sultan Abu Bakar State Mosque
 Sultan Ismail Jamek Mosque
 Tan Sri Ainuddin Wahid Mosque
 Tun Hussein Onn Jamek Mosque
 Ungku Tun Aminah Mosque

Sport centers
 Sultan Ibrahim Stadium
 Johor Circuit
 Pasir Gudang Corporation Stadium
 Taman Daya Hockey Stadium
 Tan Sri Dato' Haji Hassan Yunos Stadium

Shopping centers
 ÆON Bukit Indah Shopping Centre
 ÆON Tebrau City Shopping Centre
 ÆON Bandar Dato Onn Shopping Centre
 ÆON Permas Jaya Shopping Centre
 ÆON Mall Kulaijaya
 Angsana Johor Bahru Mall
 Batu Pahat Mall
 Beletime Danga Bay
 Galleria@Kotaraya
 Johor Bahru City Square
 Johor Premium Outlets
 Komtar JBCC
 KSL City
 IKEA Tebrau
 Paradigm Mall Johor Bahru
 Plaza Pelangi
 R&F Mall
 Sunway Big Box
 The Mall, Southkey Mid Valley
 Toppen Shopping Centre

Theme parks and resorts
 Danga Bay
 Legoland Malaysia Resort
 Tropical Village

See also
 List of tourist attractions in Malaysia

References

 
Tourism in Malaysia
Johor